The Son of Hannibal may refer to:
 The Son of Hannibal (novel), a 1914 German novel by Ludwig Wolff
 The Son of Hannibal (1918 film), a German silent film based on the novel
 The Son of Hannibal (1926 film), a German silent film, remake of the 1918 film